Flooding at Port-Marly is the title of two series of paintings by Alfred Sisley, produced at Port-Marly in 1872 (seven works) and 1876 (four works). Two works from the 1876 series are now in the Musée d'Orsay, with one hanging in the museum itself and the other at the Musée des beaux-arts de Rouen.

References

Paintings in the collection of the Musée d'Orsay
1876 paintings
Paintings by Alfred Sisley
Water in art
Impressionist paintings